Exchange and Mart is an online classified advertising website, owned by Newsquest Media Group. Exchange and Mart specialises in new and used motor vehicles, including commercial vehicles, motorcycles, caravans and motorhomes and caters for private sellers, as well as motor retailers. It was a printed publication from 1868 until 2009.

Background

Exchange and Mart was founded by news entrepreneur William Cox. In 1862 he had bought Queen, a magazine for women which had popular 'Exchange and Mart' columns allowing readers to buy and sell products. In May 1868 a weekly paper, Exchange & Mart, was founded by Cox in a converted potato warehouse in Covent Garden. It was the first in the world to specialise in classified advertising.

In 1926 Exchange and Mart was taken over by Bazaar Exchange & Mart Ltd.   

By 1999 Exchange and Mart was owned by CMP Media, which was acquired by United News & Media (later UBM) for $920 million.

In 2005, Newsquest's Exchange Enterprises division acquired Exchange & Mart and Auto Exchange from United Advertising Publications'. Exchange and Mart ceased publishing as a magazine in 2009 but continues online only.

Printed magazine

The Exchange and Mart magazine was published weekly from 1868 to 2009. During World War II, the magazine was slimmed down by paper rationing and by 1948 it was still suffering under rationing, with a circulation of 70,000.  At its peak, it reached an audited circulation of over 350,000, making Exchange & Mart a household name.

A 1998 study described Exchange and Mart as a "well known and established paper", also "hard edged, no nonsense" and popular for selling vehicles, a forerunner to more modern publications such as Loot.

However, in 2009 and with its final ABC Circulation figures (December 2007) at 21,754 Exchange and Mart focused on becoming an online only business and ceased publishing the printed magazine.

Website

ExchangeandMart.co.uk was launched in 1996 and users could buy or sell vehicles and other items online. Today, the site focuses on new and used motor vehicles. Users can search for vehicles using a wide range of filters, including price, model, postcode, age and mileage. The website also includes buying advice.

From 2012 Exchange and Mart builds and hosts web and mobile sites for independent motor dealers, helping them reach a wider, online audience. The Exchange and Mart portal allows motor stock to be broadcast to a dealer’s own mobile and website, as well as additional sites of their choice to generate additional leads.

ExchangeandMart.co.uk was relaunched in 2016 and together with a new strategy to utilise the Newsquest audience of 200 regional newspapers and 170 regional newspaper websites which can reach 24.5 million visitors per month.

Exchange and Mart powers a number of Newsquest owned titles such as s1cars.com  and the Warrington Guardian.

In March 2015, Simon Davis of Carwow wrote an article on selling cars in which he wrote "Exchange and Mart is the final Auto Trader alternative on this list. Unlike the other options we have included, you will have to pay to feature your ad on Exchange and Mart. However, with prices starting at £5, this is a small price to pay when you consider the fact that the website has a monthly audience of 7.1 million people."

Exchange and Mart TV operated from 2003 to 2005.
PetOwnersOnline.com was live from 2005 to 2006.

Mobile

Exchange and Mart launched a mobile ready version of its site in 2011 and released an app in 2012, allowing users to search for vehicles via mobile devices.

References

Official website
https://ExchangeandMart.co.uk

Automotive websites
Newspapers published by Newsquest
Publications established in 1868
Publications disestablished in 2009